The Universidad Central del Caribe is a private university in Bayamón, Puerto Rico that focuses on graduate studies and professional certifications in the health sciences. It was founded in 1976 in the municipality of Cayey, but since 1990 all its facilities have been integrated into one campus at the grounds of the Dr. Ramón Ruiz Arnau University Hospital in Bayamón.

References

External links
 Official website

Medical schools in Puerto Rico
Universities and colleges in Puerto Rico
Educational institutions established in 1976
1976 establishments in Puerto Rico